The Girl Scouts of the United States of America silver dollar is a commemorative coin issued by the United States Mint in 2013.

Design 
The obverse depicts three girls who represent the organization. According to the U.S. Mint, the designs "were approved by the Department of the Treasury on July 20, 2012, at the recommendation of the United States Mint, after consultation with Girl Scouts of the USA and the U.S. Commission of Fine Arts, as well as review by the Citizens Coinage Advisory Committee".

Distribution
The coins became available for sale on February 28, 2013.

References

2013 establishments in the United States
Girl Scouts of the USA
Modern United States commemorative coins